Diplopsalis is a genus of dinoflagellates belonging to the family Protoperidiniaceae.

The genus has cosmopolitan distribution.

Species:

Diplopsalis acuta 
Diplopsalis asymmetrica
Diplopsalis borealis 
Diplopsalis lenticula 
Diplopsalis ostenfeldii 
Diplopsalis rotundata

References

Dinophyceae
Dinoflagellate genera